Fairchild TV or FTV is a Canadian Cantonese language exempt specialty channel. It is owned by Fairchild Group, with Hong Kong broadcaster TVB holding a 20% minority stake. Fairchild TV has studios in the Greater Toronto Area (Richmond Hill, Ontario) and Greater Vancouver (inside Aberdeen Centre in Richmond, British Columbia).

The channel's origins can be traced to the Cantonese broadcasting service, Chinavision Canada was rebranded as Fairchild TV in 1993 when Thomas Fung purchased Chinavision.

Operations
Up until October 1, 2022, Fairchild TV signed on at 06:00 EST and signed off at 03:35 EST in the Greater Toronto Area. In Greater Vancouver, Fairchild TV signed on at 06:00 PST and signed off at 03:35 PST. In Alberta (Calgary and Edmonton), Fairchild TV signed on at 06:00 MST and signed off at 03:35 MST. On October 1, 2022, Fairchild TV switched to a 24-hour schedule.

More than 475,000 Chinese Canadians across Canada watch Fairchild Television each day, roughly 30% of the whole Chinese population in Canada.

FTV operates two standard definition television channels: Fairchild TV in Cantonese and Talentvision in Mandarin. Both stations use programming from Vancouver, Toronto, and Calgary. As of 23 May 2013, Fairchild TV launched two High Definition (HD) channels: Fairchild TV 2 HD in Cantonese and Talentvision 2 HD in Mandarin.

Programs
Fairchild TV broadcasts local (Canadian) and overseas (Asian) programming in the Cantonese language. It also serves as an overseas station of Hong Kong television station TVB. Due to that, Fairchild TV broadcasts TVB programmes, although at a time delay of up to one year due to obtaining overseas broadcasting rights. It has also broadcast programs from other Hong Kong television stations including ATV (previously), ViuTV, and additionally feature popular Mainland Chinese programmes. Fairchild TV also organises annual events, such as the Miss Chinese Vancouver Pageant, Miss Chinese Toronto Pageant, New Talent Singing Awards Vancouver Audition, New Talent Singing Awards Toronto Audition and Calgary New Talent Singing Awards. These programs are broadcast live nationally.  Many of the contestants from these contests have gone on to hosting television shows on Fairchild TV and some earn fame in Asia.  Most notable are Bernice Liu, Linda Chung, and Leanne Li, they were former Miss Chinese Vancouver Pageant and Miss Chinese International Pageant winners, and Jacky Chu, Elva Hsiao and Jade Kwan of New Talent Singing Awards Vancouver Audition.

Current local programming list

Weekly/daily programs
Morning Exercise 
Timeline Magazine 
What's On 
Magazine 26 
Media Focus 
Chatting Platform 時事評台

Annual events
Miss Chinese Toronto Pageant 
Miss Chinese Vancouver Pageant 
New Talent Singing Awards Calgary Audition 
New Talent Singing Awards Toronto Audition 
New Talent Singing Awards Vancouver Audition

Current artistes & presenters

Notable former presenters
The following is a list of former Fairchild Television presenters that are currently affiliated with other media outlets.
Dominic Lam, popular former Hong Kong television actor from the 80s and 90s. Prominent Fairchild TV Toronto presenter and Fairchild Radio Toronto DJ. Returned to Hong Kong entertainment industry with TVB in 2007. Currently signed with [Hong Kong Television Network] (HKTV).
Lily Hong, hosted a few programmes for Fairchild TV Toronto in the late 90s to early 2000s.  Current TVB contract artiste.
Monica Lo, Miss Chinese Toronto 1996 and Miss Chinese International 1997, hosted for Fairchild TV Toronto.  Current Hong Kong film actress and model.
Walter Ngai, prominent Fairchild TV Vancouver presenter.  Currently a DJ for Metro Broadcast Corporation Limited.
Eric Li, former Fairchild TV Vancouver presenter and news anchor.  Currently a presenter for Cable TV Hong Kong's entertainment news channel.
Janis Chan, former Fairchild Radio Vancouver DJ and host of What's On Vancouver. Currently a presenter for Cable TV Hong Kong's entertainment news channel.
Edcon Gabriel Yau  , former Fairchild TV presenter & sports news anchor in Toronto and former DJ host in Fairchild Radio Toronto. Currently a sports presenter for now TV in Hong Kong and the official NBA Global Games MC in Greater China.
Maggie Hou, former model and Fairchild TV Vancouver presenter.  Currently a presenter for TVB's entertainment news channel.
Kenny Wong, former host of What's On Vancouver.  Currently a presenter for Cable TV Hong Kong's entertainment news channel.
Eunice Ho, New Talent Singing Awards Vancouver Audition 2003 Finalist, former host of What's On Vancouver. Currently a television presenter for TVB's entertainment news channel.
Aimee Chan & Janet Chow, Miss Chinese Toronto Pageant 2004 Finalists, former hosts of What's On Toronto. Entered Miss Hong Kong Pageant 2006; Chan won the crown, Chow won first runner-up; both current TVB contract artistes.
Kayi Cheung, Miss Chinese (Vancouver) Pageant 2005 Vivacious Beauty award winner, former host of What's On Vancouver.  Entered Miss Hong Kong Pageant 2007 and won the crown.
Rikko Lee, former Fairchild Radio Vancouver DJ and host of What's On Vancouver. Signed to TVB as an artist and was a host and reporter for the 2008 Summer Olympics and 2009 Hong Kong East-Asian Games. She is currently hosting TVB's weekly sports programme Sports World and daily financial programme Money Smart on HD Jade.

See also
 Fairchild TV News
 Fairchild TV 2
 Talentvision (TTV)

References

External links
  
  

Analog cable television networks in Canada
Chinese-language television
Chinese-language mass media in Canada
Companies based in Richmond, British Columbia
Companies based in Richmond Hill, Ontario
Multicultural and ethnic television in Canada
Television channels and stations established in 1993
Mass media in the Regional Municipality of York
Mass media in Vancouver
1993 establishments in British Columbia
1993 establishments in Ontario